Elkhorn Valley Schools is located in Tilden, in the northeast section of the state of Nebraska, United States.

District statistics

The district is a Class 3 school and categorized as a C2 class size.  The district houses approximately 300 students in a K-12 campus location.  The staff consists of 33 teachers, 9 paraprofessionals, 2 administrators and 15 classified personnel.

Curriculum

The school supports a strong education foundation of scientific research based educational programs and curricula.  The curricula support and comply with the expectations and guidelines of the Nebraska A.L.L.S.T.A.R. program.  The district continuously improves its educational structure through the training and support of a six-year Reading First grant and program implementation.  An inhouse preschool, funded through Title I federal grant monies, along with the traditional kindergarten through 12th grades, focus on improving reading skills, for their school improvement plan.  Focus areas supporting the main improvement plan include the use and implementation of technology in the learning environment of all students and an increased emphasis on math skills and practice time in the classrooms.  These targeted areas provide direction for students and teachers to improve reading, math, and technology skills that will meet 21st-century expectations.

School symbols

The school colors are green and white, and the mascot is the Falcon.

References

External links
 

School districts in Nebraska
Education in Antelope County, Nebraska
Education in Madison County, Nebraska